Indian Creek is a stream in Marion County, Indiana, in the United States. It is a tributary of Fall Creek.

Indian Creek was so named from the fact that Native Americans used the area as a camping ground.

A  reservoir named Indian Lake was created by the construction of a dam on the creek in 1929.

See also
List of rivers of Indiana

References

Rivers of Marion County, Indiana
Rivers of Indiana